Wimmer's Fountain (Czech: Wimmerova kašna), or Wimmer Fountain, is an outdoor fountain and sculpture in Old Town, Prague, Czech Republic.

References

External links

 

Fountains in the Czech Republic
Outdoor sculptures in Prague
Old Town (Prague)